The Black Heart Foundation is a UK and US registered charity, founded in 2000 and chaired by businessman and philanthropist Ric Lewis. Trustees include former England Rugby Captain Matt Dawson and former England cricket captain Michael Vaughan.

Campaigns

Black Heart Scholars Programme

The Black Heart Scholars Programme was created in 2013 and provides gap-funding for young people who would otherwise not be able to achieve their ambitions or potential through Further or Higher Education. From 2013 to 2020, the Foundation provided Scholarships to 100 young people, 85% of whom are BAME, and who studied at 57 academic institutions in the UK, from the Universities of Oxford and Cambridge, Bristol and Loughborough through to the commercial flight school at Aer Lingus and The Urdang Academy of performing arts in London.

Each Day, Every Day Crowdfunding Campaign

In 2020, the Foundation launched a crowdfunding campaign which raised an additional £1.5 million, including backing from Stormzy, to support a further 150 scholars.

References

External links 

 Official website

Charities based in the United Kingdom
Charities based in the United States